Jane Ellen Jackson Boyle (born December 15, 1954) is a United States district judge of the United States District Court for the Northern District of Texas.

Early life and education
Born in Sharon, Pennsylvania, Boyle graduated from the University of Texas with her Bachelor of Science degree in 1977 and later from Dedman School of Law at Southern Methodist University with a Juris Doctor in 1981.

Legal career
She was a misdemeanor and felony prosecutor in the Dallas County District Attorney's Office from 1981 to 1985 and was a Chief felony prosecutor from 1985 to 1987. Boyle was an Assistant United States Attorney for the U.S. Attorney's Office, Northern District of Texas from 1987 to 1990. She served as a United States magistrate judge of the Northern District of Texas from 1990 to 2002. In 2002, Boyle became the United States Attorney for the Northern District of Texas until her appointment as a federal judge in 2004.

Federal judicial career
On November 24, 2003, Boyle was nominated to the United States District Court for the Northern District of Texas by President George W. Bush, to a seat vacated by Jerry Buchmeyer. Boyle was confirmed by the Senate on June 17, 2004 on a Senate vote and received her commission on June 29, 2004.

References

Sources

1954 births
Living people
Assistant United States Attorneys
Judges of the United States District Court for the Northern District of Texas
Dedman School of Law alumni
United States magistrate judges
United States district court judges appointed by George W. Bush
21st-century American judges
University of Texas at Austin alumni
United States Attorneys for the Northern District of Texas
21st-century American women judges